Nexus 2 may refer to:

 Nexus S, the second Google Nexus device. 
 Nexus: The Jupiter Incident 2, an attempted kickstarter game.
 Nexus 2, the ROM-based sampling VST by reFX